Gabriel Alejandro Paletta (born 15 February 1986) is a professional footballer who plays as a centre-back.

Born in Argentina to parents of Italian descent, Paletta represented his birth nation at the under-20 level, participating in the 2005 FIFA World Youth Championship in the Netherlands. He started all seven matches as Argentina won the title. In 2014, Paletta was called up to the Italy national team and made his debut in a friendly against Spain. He represented Italy at the FIFA World Cup later that year.

Club career

Banfield
Paletta came through the youth divisions of Banfield and reached the first team in 2005. When Banfield qualified for the knockout stages of the Copa Libertadores, they altered their 25-man squad for the event to include Paletta and immediately threw him into action against the Colombian team Independiente Medellín. Paletta played well and Banfield progressed, but Paletta was to play no further part in the tournament after being called up to the Argentina under-20 team to participate in the 2005 FIFA World Youth Championship.

Liverpool
In February 2006, Paletta agreed to sign with Liverpool and eventually signed a four-year contract on 4 July 2006. Paletta became the second Argentine to play for the Merseyside club, after Mauricio Pellegrino. Paletta's first appearance for Liverpool came in a pre-season friendly against Wrexham in July. He scored his first goal for Liverpool during a 2006–07 Football League Cup third round 4–3 win against Reading on 25 October 2006. Paletta debuted for Liverpool in the 2006–07 Premier League season in a 4–0 away win against Wigan Athletic on 2 December; he was substituted onto the field for Sami Hyypiä in the 61st minute. Paletta would go on to make just two more league appearances for Liverpool.

Paletta debuted in the 2006–07 UEFA Champions League in a group stage fixture in a 3–2 away defeat against Galatasaray on 5 December. He was substituted off of the field in the 66th minute for Luis García. Paletta played a full 90 minutes of Liverpool's 2006–07 Football League Cup quarter-final match, a 6–3 home defeat against Arsenal on 9 January 2007. By the time that Paletta had made just eight appearances for Liverpool in all competitions, it was reported on 9 July that Paletta would be loaned to Spanish club Levante in order to gain some valuable first-team experience as Levante had expressed their interest signing Paletta on loan deal for the whole of 2007–08 season. Although Liverpool manager Rafael Benítez had agreed to loaning the defender, the loan deal was not reached. Liverpool went on to reach the final of the 2006–07 UEFA Champions League, losing 2–1 to AC Milan on 23 May 2007. On 26 August, it had been officially reported that Liverpool had agreed for Paletta to sign with Boca Juniors, having welcomed the arrival of Argentine Emiliano Insúa.

Boca Juniors

2007–08 season
In August 2007, Paletta joined Boca Juniors where he was handed the number 29 shirt. He debuted for Boca Juniors in the Torneo Apertura of the 2007–08 Primera División season on 29 August 2007. One month later, Paletta scored his first goal for Boca Juniors in the 84th minute of a 2–2 home draw with Gimnasia de Jujuy on 23 September. He participated in his first Superclásico, which resulted in a 2–0 win to River Plate at the Estadio Monumental, on 7 October. Paletta played a full 90 minutes of Boca's 2007 FIFA Club World Cup 1–0 semi-final win against Étoile du Sahel on 12 December. Four days later, he played a full 90 minutes of the final which resulted in a 4–2 win for European champions Milan on 16 December.

During the 2008 Torneo de Verano, Paletta scored with header from a Jesús Dátolo free-kick in the 3–2 Copa Revancha loss against River Plate. Paletta's first appearance in the 2008 Copa Libertadores came in a 1–1 away draw against Venezuelan club Maracaibo on 20 February. He received his first red card during the Torneo Clausura in a 1–1 home draw against Independiente on 9 March. Paletta scored his first Copa Libertadores goal after nine minutes in Boca's last group stage fixture, a 3–0 home win against Maracaibo on 22 April. The 3–0 win meant that Boca advanced to the 2008 Copa Libertadores knockout stages. Paletta scored his second league goal for Boca in a 2–1 home victory against Racing Club on 17 May. Paletta participated in the Copa Libertadores knockout stage fixtures until Boca were eliminated by Fluminense in the semi-finals. He scored his third league goal for Boca with a header in the 40th minute of the first-half, in a 6–2 home victory against Tigre on 22 June.

2008–09 season
Paletta played in both of Boca's 2008 Recopa Sudamericana matches, defeating Arsenal de Sarandí 5–3 on aggregate, winning 3–1 on 13 August and drawing 2–2 on 27 August. On 11 November, it was reported that MRI scans confirmed that Paletta had torn the cruciate ligament in his right knee after a 1–0 away victory against Arsenal de Sarandí on 9 November, and was ruled out of play for six months. Boca's club doctor, José Veiga, had seen that Paletta had a knee twist and ordered him to undergo some scans after the 1–0 victory against Arsenal. Boca Juniors went on to claim the Torneo Apertura title of the 2008–09 Argentine Primera División season. Paletta returned in a 2–1 home win against Arsenal de Sarandí on 17 May, playing a full 90 minutes of the match. One week later, Paletta suffered an ankle sprain and was substituted off of the field in the 15th minute for Gastón Sauro in a 2–0 away loss against Vélez Sársfield on 24 May. Boca had also participated in the 2009 Copa Libertadores, reaching the knockout stages of the tournament where they were eliminated by Uruguayan club Defensor Sporting.

2009–10 season
In August 2009, it was reported that a deal with Paletta and Italian club Palermo fell through due to a disagreement of Paletta's price. Greek club Panathinaikos were also chasing his signature. Paletta played a full 90 minutes of Boca Juniors 2009 Copa Sudamericana First Stage match, a 1–1 draw with Vélez Sársfield on 20 August. Paletta scored an own goal for Boca in the 73rd minute, levelling the scores. He again played a full 90 minutes of the second-leg, where Boca Juniors were defeated 1–0 on 16 September. The 2–1 aggregate loss saw Boca Juniors eliminated from the competition. Paletta received his first red card of the 2009–10 Argentine Primera División season in a 4–2 away loss against Newell's Old Boys on 6 February. His first goal of the 2009–2010 season came in a 2–1 home defeat against Huracán on 9 May. Paletta scored in the 50th minute with a right footed shot. Paletta's last game for Boca Juniors came in a 3–0 away defeat against his former club Banfield on 14 May, where he scored an own goal in the 67th minute.

Parma
On 6 July 2010, Italian Serie A club Parma announced via their website the acquisition outright of Paletta from Boca Juniors. He was a regular in the side, seeing off the challenge of Massimo Paci and partnering Alessandro Lucarelli. This partnership continued for the first half of the following season under Franco Colomba, but Roberto Donadoni's arrival in January 2012 saw a switch to three defenders and Paletta enjoyed a fine end to the season.

In August 2012, Paletta signed a three-year extension to the contract he signed with the club in 2010; It tied him to the club until 2017.

AC Milan
On 2 February 2015, Milan signed Paletta for €3.5 million fee. He signed a 3.5-year contract.

On 27 August 2015, Paletta signed for Atalanta on a season-long loan.

Upon his return to Milan, Paletta was often selected by manager Vincenzo Montella, making 30 appearances and scoring two goals in the 2016–17 Serie A season. During the season, he had also been sent off a record 5 times, two of which were straight red cards.

With the arrival of 11 new players in the summer transfer window, including central defenders Mateo Musacchio and Leonardo Bonucci, Paletta's opportunities at the club had been significantly limited. Despite being featured in a few friendly games during the summer, Paletta had been declared "out of project" by manager Vincenzo Montella, who was dismissed in November 2018. Nevertheless, Paletta was included in Milan's squad list for the group stage of Europa League. While continuing to train with the senior team, Paletta made several appearances for the club's youth team, managed by Gennaro Gattuso at the time. With Gattuso's appointment as a head coach of the senior team, Paletta got a rare opportunity to play full 90 minutes in an away Europa League 0-2 defeat against Rijeka once Milan had already qualified for the knockout stage.

Paletta was released from his contract on 30 January 2018 by mutual consent.

Jiangsu Suning
On 23 February 2018, Paletta signed for Chinese Super League club Jiangsu Suning.

Monza
After being released by Jiangsu Suning, on 6 November 2019 Paletta signed a three-year contract for then-Serie C club Monza, owned by former AC Milan chairman Silvio Berlusconi and coached by his former teammate Cristian Brocchi.

International career
In 2005, Paletta was selected for the Argentina under-20 team to participate in the 2005 FIFA World Youth Championship. He started in all seven games of the tournament, playing in the heart of the Argentine defence in a side also featuring future senior team stars Lionel Messi and Sergio Agüero. Argentina went on to win the tournament, and Paletta's performances attracted the attention of Liverpool.

In possession of an Italian passport due to his ancestry from Savelli in the province of Crotone, in Calabria, where his great-grandfather Vincenzo emigrated from, Paletta is also eligible for the Italy national team. In March 2014, he was called up to Italy's squad for a friendly against Spain. He earned his first cap on 5 March, playing the full 90 minutes in the 0–1 loss against Spain.

On 1 June of that year, Paletta was named in Italy's squad for the 2014 FIFA World Cup. He made his competitive debut in the team's opening match, starting alongside Andrea Barzagli in central defence as the Azzurri beat England in Manaus.

Style of play
Paletta is capable of playing as a centre-back in both a three or four-man defence. He is good in possession and an attentive man-marker, although he is primarily known for his composure, aerial ability and heading accuracy; he has also drawn some criticism at times for being inconsistent, error-prone, and excessively aggressive when tackling, which led to unnecessary bookings and expulsions on numerous occasions.

Career statistics

Club

International

Honours
Boca Juniors
 Recopa Sudamericana: 2008
 Argentine Primera División: 2008 Torneo Apertura
 FIFA Club World Cup runner-up: 2007

AC Milan
 Supercoppa Italiana: 2016

Monza
 Serie C Group A: 2019–20
Argentina U20
 FIFA World Youth Championship: 2005

References

External links

 
 LFChistory.net player profile
  
 
 
 

1986 births
Living people
People from Almirante Brown Partido
Sportspeople from Buenos Aires Province
Argentine footballers
Italian footballers
Club Atlético Banfield footballers
Association football central defenders
Boca Juniors footballers
Liverpool F.C. players
Parma Calcio 1913 players
A.C. Milan players
Atalanta B.C. players
Jiangsu F.C. players
A.C. Monza players
Premier League players
Argentine Primera División players
Serie A players
Chinese Super League players
Serie C players
Serie B players
Argentine expatriate footballers
Expatriate footballers in England
Expatriate footballers in Italy
Expatriate footballers in China
Argentine expatriate sportspeople in England
Argentine expatriate sportspeople in Italy
Argentine expatriate sportspeople in China
Argentina under-20 international footballers
Italy international footballers
Argentine people of Calabrian descent
Argentine people of Italian descent
Italian people of Argentine descent
2014 FIFA World Cup players